The beryl-spangled tanager (Tangara nigroviridis) is a small songbird of the northern Andes.

Taxonomy
First described by Frédéric de Lafresnaye in 1843, the beryl-spangled tanager is one of dozens of tanager species in the genus Tangara.

Description
Its plumage is largely turquoise, though heavily marked with black spots and scales. Its breast and belly are primarily black, with opalescent greenish spotting.

Habitat and distribution
The beryl-spangled tanager is found on the eastern slopes of the Andes from Venezuela, though Colombia, Ecuador and Peru to Bolivia. It occurs in humid montane forest and second growth.

References 

 Robert Ridgely & Guy Tudor, Birds of South America Vol. 1 (Univ. Texas Press, 1989).

beryl-spangled tanager
Birds of the Northern Andes
beryl-spangled tanager